Kobi Jordan Simmons (born July 4, 1997) is an American professional basketball player for the Greensboro Swarm of the NBA G League. He played college basketball for the Arizona Wildcats.

High school career

Simmons attended St. Francis in Milton, Georgia. In his freshman year, Simmons averaged 14.1 points, 3.9 assists, 2.7 rebounds, and 2.0 steals per game. As a sophomore in 2013–14, he averaged 17.4 points, 4.8 assists, and 3.5 rebounds per game.

As a junior, Simmons averaged 21.2 points per game, 4.2 assists per game, and 2.9 rebounds per game in 32 games. In the summer of his junior year, Simmons played in the 2015 Under Armour Elite 24 Game in Brooklyn, New York. He was later invited to camps such as the Adidas Nations and Adidas Euro-camps. As a senior, Simmons averaged 26.0 points, 4.0 rebounds and 4.0 assists per outing. In his last game for the Knights, he scored 36 points, including seven three-pointers in the semi-final game against Milton High School. Throughout his high school career, Simmons led St. Francis to 100 victories, two state championships and Four state championship appearances. On January 16, Simmons committed to Arizona.
In January 2016, Simmons was named a McDonald's All-American and played in the 2016 McDonald's All-American Game on March 30 at the United Center in Chicago, where he recorded 12 points, 2 assists, and 1 steal in a 114–107 loss to the West Team. Simmons was rated as a five-star recruit and ranked 20th in the Class of 2016 according to ESPN. He also earned Atlanta Journal-Constitution Player of the Year honors.
His number has been retired at St. Francis.

College career
Simmons played one season of college basketball for Arizona. On November 11, 2016, Simmons scored 18 points, tying the most points in an NCAA debut for an Arizona player in a decade, leading the Wildcats to victory in a 65–63 win against No. 12 ranked Michigan State in the Armed Forces Classic. On January 21, 2017, Simmons recorded 20 points, 6 rebounds, and 5 assists in a 96–85 win against No. 3 ranked UCLA. As the No. 2 seed in the Pac-12 Conference men's basketball tournament, Arizona defeated Colorado in the quarter-finals and UCLA in the semi-finals. On March 11, 2017, Simmons and Arizona defeated Oregon 83–80 to win the Pac-12 Conference Championship. The Wildcats entered the NCAA tournament as the No. 2 Seed in the West Region, where Arizona defeated North Dakota in the first round and St. Mary's in the second round before losing to Xavier in the Sweet Sixteen. Simmons appeared in 37 games (19 starts) as a freshman and averaged 8.7 points, 1.6 rebounds and 2.0 assists in 23.5 minutes per game.

On April 5, 2017, Simmons declared for the NBA draft, forgoing his final three years of college eligibility.

Professional career

Memphis Grizzlies (2017–2018)
Simmons and split playing time between the Grizzlies and their new G League affiliate, the Memphis Hustle. His NBA debut with the Grizzlies came on November 29, 2017, in a 95–104 loss to the San Antonio Spurs. He played a total of 32 games (12 starts) for the Grizzlies, averaging 6.1 points, 2.1 assists and 1.6 rebounds per contest. He converted all 25 of his 25 free throws during his NBA stint. Simmons was waived by the Grizzlies on August 28, 2018. In G League play, Simmons averaged 15.1 points, 3.9 assists and 2.7 rebounds in 26 outings for the Memphis Hustle.

Canton Charge (2018–2019)
On September 14, 2018, Simmons signed with the Cleveland Cavaliers. On October 13, he was waived by the Cavaliers. He then joined the Cavs’ NBA G League affiliate, the Canton Charge.

Cleveland Cavaliers (2019)
On January 27, 2019, the Cleveland Cavaliers signed Simmons to a 10-day contract, but was later waived by the Cleveland Cavaliers on February 4.

Greensboro Swarm (2019–2021)
On September 16, 2019, the Charlotte Hornets announced that they had signed with Simmons. On October 20, 2019, the Charlotte Hornets announced that they had converted Simmons' contract into a two-way contract.

For the 2020–21 season, Simmons rejoined the Greensboro Swarm of the G League where he averaged 18 points 6 assist and 5 rebounds a game.

Stal Ostrów Wielkopolski (2021–2022)
On September 25, 2021, Simmons signed with Stal Ostrów Wielkopolski of the Polish Basketball League.

Return to Greensboro (2022–present)
On November 4, 2022, Simmons was named to the opening night roster for the Greensboro Swarm.

NBA career statistics

Regular season

|-
| style="text-align:left;"| 
| style="text-align:left;"| Memphis
| 32 || 12 || 20.1 || .423 || .282 || 1.000 || 1.6 || 2.1 || .6 || .2 || 6.1
|-
| style="text-align:left;"| 
| style="text-align:left;"| Cleveland
| 1 || 0 || 1.8 || — || — || — || .0 || .0 || .0 || .0 || .0
|- class="sortbottom"
| style="text-align:center;" colspan="2"| Career
| 33 || 12 || 19.5 || .423 || .282 || 1.000 || 1.5 || 2.1 || .5 || .2 || 5.9

References

External links
 Arizona Wildcats bio

1997 births
Living people
21st-century African-American sportspeople
African-American basketball players
American men's basketball players
Arizona Wildcats men's basketball players
Basketball players from Atlanta
Canton Charge players
Cleveland Cavaliers players
Greensboro Swarm players
McDonald's High School All-Americans
Memphis Grizzlies players
Memphis Hustle players
Point guards
Stal Ostrów Wielkopolski players
Undrafted National Basketball Association players